Eddie Dodd is an American drama television series created by Lawrence Lasker, Walter Parkes and Wesley Strick. It is based on the 1989 film True Believer. The series stars Treat Williams, Annabelle Gurwitch, Corey Parker and Sydney Walsh. The series aired on ABC from March 12, 1991, to June 5, 1991.

Cast 
Treat Williams as Eddie Dodd
Annabelle Gurwitch as Billie
Corey Parker as Roger Barron
Sydney Walsh as Kitty Greer

Episodes

References

External links
 

1990s American drama television series
1991 American television series debuts
1991 American television series endings
1990s American legal television series
Television series by Sony Pictures Television
English-language television shows
Television shows set in New York City
American Broadcasting Company original programming
Television series created by Walter F. Parkes